Havreflarn, or havrekakor in Sweden, are Norwegian oatmeal cookies with a brittle, crisp texture. It is prepared traditionally with rolled oats, brown sugar, flour, and various spices, such as cinnamon and nutmeg. Occasionally, they are topped with a chocolate drizzle for added flavor.

Recipes 
 True North Kitchen
 A Kitchen Hoor's Adventure
 Sons of Norway

See also 
 List of Norwegian desserts
 Norwegian cuisine

References 

Norwegian cuisine
Norwegian desserts